M.M. Ispahani Limited, also known as The Ispahani Group, is a Bangladeshi conglomerate headquartered in Chittagong. Founded in 1820, it is the oldest company in Bangladesh and is owned by the Ispahani family. The group owns Bangladesh's leading tea company, as well as other major food brands in the country. It also has interests in real estate, textiles, agriculture, shipping, jute, packaging and hospitality.

The group was awarded "Enterprise of the year" at the Bangladesh Business Awards in 2003.  According to The Daily Star, M.M. Ispahani is one of the most respected business concerns in the subcontinent.

Awards
2003 - Enterprise of the Year - Bangladesh Business Awards
2004 - AmCham Business Executive of the Year (for managing director M. Salman Ispahani) - American Chamber of Commerce in Bangladesh
2017 - Green Business Climate Award 
2018 - Best Brand Award 2018

See also
Mirza Ahmad Ispahani, Chairman (1934-1949)
Mirza Mehdy Ispahani (Sadri Ispahani), Chairman (1949-2004)
Yar Mohammad Khan, Director (1958)
Mirza Ali Behrouze Ispahani, Chairman (2004-2017)
Godrej family and Tata family, other Indo-Persian business families

References

External links
Official Website
Ispahani Tea Website

Bangladeshi brands
Conglomerate companies established in 1934
Companies based in Chittagong
Conglomerate companies of Bangladesh
Real estate companies of Bangladesh
Real estate companies established in 1934
Food and drink companies established in 1934
1934 establishments in India